The Clayton–Hamilton Jazz Orchestra is a big band led by Jeff Hamilton and brothers John Clayton and Jeff Clayton. The band was founded in Los Angeles in 1985.

Personnel
On the album The L. A. Treasures Project (Capri, 2014):

 John Clayton: arco bass
 Jeff Clayton: alto saxophone
 Jeff Hamilton: drums
 Bijon Watson: trumpet
 Gilbert Castellanos: trumpet
 James Ford: trumpet
 Brian Swartz: trumpet
 Jamie Hovorka: trumpet
 Ira Nepus: trombone
 George Bohanon: trombone
 Ryan Porter: trombone
 Maurice Spears: trombone
 Keith Fiddmont: alto saxophone
 Rickey Woodard: tenor saxophone
 Charles Owens: tenor saxophone
 Lee Callet: baritone saxophone
 Tamir Hendelman: piano
 Christopher Luty: bass
 Graham Dechter: electric guitar
 Ernie Andrews: vocals
 Barbara Morrison: vocals

Discography
 Groove Shop (Capri, 1990)
 Heart and Soul (Capri, 1991)
 Absolutely! (Lake Street, 1995)
 Explosive! (Qwest/Warner Bros., 1999)
 Shout Me Out! (Fable/Lightyear, 2000)
 Live at MCG (MCG, 2005)
 Christmas Songs (Diana Krall album, featuring The Clayton–Hamilton Jazz Orchestra) (Verve, 2005)
 Call Me Irresponsible (Michael Bublé album, song: "The Best Is Yet to Come") (143 Records/WB, 2007)
 Charles Aznavour & The Clayton-Hamilton Jazz Orchestra (EMI, 2009)
 Sundays in New York (Trijntje Oosterhui album featuring The Clayton–Hamilton Jazz Orchestra) (Blue Note, 2011)
 The L. A. Treasures Project (Capri, 2014)
 Life Journey (Leon Russell album, songs: "Georgia On My Mind", "I Got It Bad (and That Ain't Good)", and "New York State of Mind") (Universal, 2014)

References

External links

Big bands
Musical groups established in 1985
1985 establishments in California